Paula R. Pietromonaco is an American psychologist and principal investigator of the Growth in Early Marriage Project at University of Massachusetts, Amherst. She is the editor-in-chief of the journal Emotion, as well as the associate editor of Journal of Personality and Social Psychology: Interpersonal Relations and Group Processes section.

Career
Pietromonaco earned her bachelor's degree from the University of California, Los Angeles, in 1975 and her doctoral degree from the University of Michigan in 1983. Since then, she has held different positions in multiple universities, before attaining her current position of Professor Emerita at the Department of Psychological and Brain Sciences of University of Massachusetts, Amherst in 2018.

She was president of the APA Coalition for Academic, Scientific, and Applied Research Psychology from 2014 to 2015, and a member of the SPSP Executive Board from 2010 to 2016. She is also on the editorial board of multiple APA journals.  As the editor-in-chief of Emotion, Pietromonaco stated her intent to prioritize research on affective processes and emotion, and encourages submissions connecting different subdisciplines and fields. She also wants to continue the journal's emphasis on diverse methodologies.

Research
Pietromonaco's research mainly focuses on close relationships, with relationship processes investigated by understanding behavioral, physiological, affective, and cognitive processes. Her teaching and research interests also include social psychology, health psychology, emotion, and research methods.

In one of her studies, Pietromonaco and other researchers investigate how attachment styles of couples affect their cortisol levels and risks of future mental health issues. It is suggested that couples with wives having the anxious attachment style and husbands having the avoidant attachment style stand more chances of developing depression and anxiety over time. Similarly, she and other researchers state that the attachment styles can affect how people behave and think during interpersonal conflicts. She has also emphasized in other studies that a partner plays an important part when a person faces a stressful event or has chronic diseases. Partners can help calm or can make recovery more difficult, depending on their behavior.
In another study with college students, her team has found that responsiveness affects the intimacy of self-disclosure among couples.

References

Year of birth missing (living people)
Living people
21st-century American psychologists
American women psychologists
University of California, Los Angeles alumni
University of Massachusetts Amherst faculty
University of Michigan alumni
American editors
Academic journal editors
American women editors
21st-century American women scientists
American women academics
Fulbright alumni